Jampur Union is a union, the smallest administrative body of Bangladesh, located in Sonargaon Upazila, Narayanganj District, Bangladesh. The total population is 33,457.

References

Unions of Sonargaon Upazila